The Old Dark House may refer to:

 The Old Dark House (1932 film), an American pre-Code horror film
 The Old Dark House (1963 film), a comedy-mystery film